Pittosporum undulatum is a fast-growing tree in the family Pittosporaceae. It is sometimes also known as sweet pittosporum, native daphne, Australian cheesewood,  Victorian box or mock orange.

P. undulatum has become invasive in parts of Australia where it is not indigenous. It is also highly invasive in South Africa, the Caribbean, Hawaii, the Azores and southern Brazil.

Description
Its evergreen leaves are lance-shaped (lanceolate), with wavy (undulating) margins. It carries conspicuous orange woody fruits about 1 cm in diameter for several months after flowering in spring or early summer.

Taxonomy
French botanist Étienne Pierre Ventenat described Pittosporum undulatum in 1802.

Distribution and habitat
Originally Pittosporum undulatum grew in moist areas on the Australian east coast, where its natural range was from south-east Queensland to eastern Victoria, but has increased its range since European settlement.

Ecology
Likely pollinators of its flowers are moths and butterflies, as the flower produces a fragrant perfume at night. The fruit are eaten by currawongs, red-whiskered bulbuls, Indian mynahs and grey-headed flying fox. Seed is dispersed in bird faeces.

Invasive species

The earliest known record (according to the Australian Virtual Herbarium) is from Port Jackson, Sydney, in 1803. However, P. undulatum'''s status around the Sydney area is contentious. Even though it is native to the region, P. undulatum has spread to soils and bushland where it wasn't found before European settlement, often out-competing other plants.Pittosporum undulatum is the most invasive tree species in the Azores, and has spread through most of the mid to low altitude forests, outshading and replacing native trees like Morella faya and Laurus azorica.

Pittosporum has done especially well in areas where the environment has been altered by humans – for example by habitat fragmentation weakening other natives, by fertilizer runoff from homes increasing soil nutrients and by the suppression of bushfires near suburbs. Unlike most natives, P. undulatum'' takes advantage of high nutrient levels and its seeds can germinate without needing fire. This has led to the species sometimes receiving the "invasive" label although some think that it is merely returning to areas where it grew before people arrived in Australia and began burning the environment far beyond that which previously occurred.

Recommended control measures have included the identification and selective removal of female trees to prevent spread, as well as careful burning, where possible, together with follow-up weeding.

Images

References

External links

 
 
 

undulatum
Apiales of Australia
Trees of Australia
Flora of New South Wales
Flora of Queensland
Flora of Victoria (Australia)
Garden plants of Australia
Ornamental trees
Shrubs
Introduced plants of South America